Houston Knights is an American crime drama television series set in Houston, Texas. The show ran on CBS from March 11, 1987 to June 7, 1988 and had 31 episodes.

Summary
The core of the series is the partnership between two very different cops from two different cultures. Chicago cop Joey LaFiamma, played by Michael Paré, is transferred to Houston after he kills a mobster from a powerful Mafia family and a contract is put out on him.  Once there, he is partnered with Levon Lundy, played by Michael Beck, the grandson of a Texas Ranger.

Although as different as night and day, and after a rocky beginning (the two engage in a fist-fight) they form a successful partnership and become friends.  This is aided to a certain extent by an event where a hitman from Chicago who holds the contract to shoot La Fiamma arrives in Houston and is ultimately killed by Lundy.

During the series, it is revealed that both La Fiamma and Lundy have their own personal demons. La Fiamma's Chicago partner had been killed when the partner went into a crime scene while La Fiamma had waited for backup to arrive.  Lundy's wife had been killed by an explosion that was intended to kill him.

Background
Producer Jay Bernstein said the show "goes against the grain of current television thinking. It's an hour-long episode show at a time when half-hour comedy is king. It features two male police officers when family situation stories are hot."

Bernstein said the leads needed to say what America should be... Houston Knights was created on a formula that started with Columbia Pictures. They had these two-reelers during the 1930s using two leading men who always fought with each other. There was the same relationship between John Wayne and Randolph Scott in the 1940s in movies like 'Pittsburgh.' This is different for television, but has been used in the movies since the 1930s. These are principled men. They're in the 1980s but with the conservative morals of the 1940s."

The show was renewed for a second season. Beck said his relationship on air with Pare would be "less abrasive... We used that as a starting-off point, but everyone now feels that coming into living rooms that way, week after week, might grow a little tiring for the viewer. We'll have more of a needling instead of an 'I-hate-your-guts' feel between them. There'll still be a rivalry and animosity there, but not quite so hard-edged."

Music
The theme music for the series was Texan blues-rock style, opening with a steamy saxophone then featuring slide guitar work and a heavy bass line. Dennis McCarthy and George Doering composed the music for the series. Lee Ritenour is also credited as a major contributor to the music featured in the series.

Features
One of the key features of the show was the car driven by La Fiamma, an ice-blue 289 AC Cobra "replicar", credited as being provided by "North American Fibreglass".  The car was yet another way to demonstrate that La Fiamma didn't "fit" in Texas, as most other characters on the show drove pickup trucks (including Lundy).

The wardrobe for La Fiamma consisted of well-cut and stylish Italian label clothing, another contrast to Lundy, who was always attired in typical Texas "cowboy" clothes.

Reception
The New York Times said the pilot "is so confused and confusing that it is impossible to tell whether this latest police-detective romp can pull itself together long enough to have a shot at surviving."

Episodes
The titles of the 31 episodes are listed below, along with their original TV air dates.  Although they are listed separately, the first two episodes were originally screened as a movie-length pilot.  The first 9 episodes comprised the first season, the remaining 22 episodes formed season two. The first season ranked 34th out of 79 shows with a 15.1/26 rating/share.

Season 1 (1987)

Season 2 (1987–88)

References

External links
 
 

1987 American television series debuts
1988 American television series endings
Television series by Sony Pictures Television
Television shows set in Houston
1980s American crime drama television series
English-language television shows
CBS original programming